Greenfield Township is one of ten townships in Orange County, Indiana, United States. As of the 2010 census, its population was 730 and it contained 530 housing units.

Geography

Unincorporated towns
 Ethel at 
 Fargo at 
 Greenbrier at 
 Youngs Creek at 
(This list is based on USGS data and may include former settlements.)

Major highways
  Indiana State Road 37

Lakes
 Tucker Lake

School districts
 Paoli Community School Corporation

Political districts
 Indiana's 9th congressional district
 State House District 62
 State Senate District 48

References
 
 United States Census Bureau 2008 TIGER/Line Shapefiles
 IndianaMap

External links
 Indiana Township Association
 United Township Association of Indiana
 City-Data.com page for Greenfield Township

Townships in Orange County, Indiana
Townships in Indiana